The Turcotte River is a tributary of the Turgeon River flowing in Canada in:
Cochrane District, Northeastern Ontario;
Eeyou Istchee Baie-James (municipality), in the Township of Dieppe.

The surface of the river is usually frozen from early November to mid-May, but safe circulation on the ice generally occurs from mid-November to the end of April.

Geography 
The main hydrographic slopes adjacent to the Turcotte River are:
North side: Little Turcotte River, Detour River;
East side: Turgeon River, Garneau River;
South side: Burntbush River, Kabika River;
West side: Chabie River, Burntbush River.

The Turcotte River originates at the mouth of Upper Turcotte Lake in the eastern part of the Cochrane District, in Ontario.

The mouth of Upper Turcotte Lake is located at:
 at west of the boundary between Ontario and Quebec;
 at northwest of the mouth of the Turcotte River (confluence with the Turgeon River);
 at southwest of the mouth of the Turgeon River (in Quebec);
 at southeast of a southern bay of Kesagami Lake in Ontario.

 southeast to a stream (coming from the north);
 southwest to the western discharge of two unidentified lakes;
 to the south-east by crossing marsh areas to the outlet of Lake Walford (coming from the Northeast);
 southeast to the confluence of the Little Turcotte River (coming from the northwest);
 southeasterly to the mouth of Lake Sigal the current crosses eastward on  the northern part;
 northeast by collecting a creek (from the north), then the east, to a stream (coming from the northwest);
 at southward by winding to the northern limit of the Township of Bradette;
 southward in the Township of Bradette, to the discharge (coming from the northwest) of Lake Poulos;
 at south to the boundary between Ontario and Quebec.

The Turcotte River flows to the northwest bank of the Turgeon River. This confluence is located at:
southwest of the mouth of the Turgeon River (confluence with the Harricana River);
 at east of the boundary between Quebec and Ontario;
 at west of the center of the village of Joutel, Quebec, in Quebec;
 at north of downtown La Sarre, Quebec, in Quebec.

Toponymy 
The term "Turcotte" is a surname of family of French origin.

The name "Rivière Turcotte" was officialized on December 5, 1968, at the Commission de toponymie du Québec, or at the creation of this commission.

See also 
Cochrane District, an administrative district of Ontario
Northeastern Ontario
Eeyou Istchee Baie-James (municipality)
Little Turcotte River, a stream
Turgeon River, a stream
Harricana River, a watercourse
James Bay, a body of water
List of rivers of Ontario
List of rivers of Quebec

References

External links 

Rivers of Cochrane District
Rivers of Nord-du-Québec